The Asian Carom Billiard Confederation (ACBC) is the Asian governing body of carom billiards and is affiliated to the world federation Union Mondiale de Billard (UMB).

Work 
The ACBC is responsible for the organisation of international tournaments in Asia. It has currently 11 members, which are responsible for the tournaments at the national level, like the national championships.

Members 
The ACBC has currently 11 members:
 CTBA –  Chinese Taipei Billiard Association
 BSFI –  Billiards & Snooker Federation of India
 AIBA –  All Indonesian Billiards Association
 NBA –  Nippon Billiard Association
 JBF –  Jordan Billiard Federation
 KBF –  Korea Billiards Federation 
 LBF –  Lebanese Billiard Federation
 PB & SCP –  Philippines Billiards & SCP
 SAB & BSF –  Syrian Arab Billiards & Bowling Sport Federation
 BSAT –  Billiard Sports Association of Thailand
 VBSF –  Vietnam Billiards & Snooker Federation

Federation structure

See also 
 African Carom Confederation (ACC)
 Confédération Européenne de Billard (CEB)
 Confederación Panamericana de Billar (CPB)

References 

Carom billiards organizations
Organizations based in Tokyo